Alois Georg Josef Rainer (born 7 January 1965) is a German butcher and politician of the Christian Social Union in Bavaria who has been serving as a member of the Bundestag from the state of Bavaria since 2013.

Political career 
Born in Straubing, Rainer first became a member of the Bundestag in the 2013 German federal election. In parliament, he served on the Budget Committee and the Audit Committee from 2013 to 2019; in this capacity, he was his parliamentary group’s rapporteur on the annual budget of the Federal Ministry of Family Affairs, Senior Citizens, Women and Youth. From 2019 to 2021 he was a member of the Committee on Transport and Digital Infrastructure, where he is his parliamentary group’s spokesperson.

Since the 2021 elections, Rainer has been serving as chair of the Finance Committee.

Personal life 
Rainer is the younger brother of fellow politician Gerda Hasselfeldt.

References

External links 

  
 Bundestag biography 

1965 births
Living people
Members of the Bundestag for Bavaria
Members of the Bundestag 2021–2025
Members of the Bundestag 2017–2021
Members of the Bundestag 2013–2017
People from Straubing
Members of the Bundestag for the Christian Social Union in Bavaria